Nitzan (lit. Flower bud) is a religiously observant community settlement in southern Israel. Located within the Nitzanim Sand Dune Reserve north of Ashkelon, it falls under the jurisdiction of Hof Ashkelon Regional Council.

History

Kibbutz Nitzanim
The first settlement on Nitzan's current grounds was the kibbutz of Nitzanim in 1943. The kibbutz was established after the Jewish National Fund purchased a  plot of land and a large house known as the "mansion" in 1942. The first residents were immigrants, some of whom were Holocaust survivors. It later absorbed more immigrants from Poland and Romania. The kibbutz was conquered by Egypt during the 1948 Arab–Israeli War, but recaptured by Israel towards the end of the conflict. However, the kibbutz was re-established  to the south.

Nitzanim youth village
The original site became a youth village. It operated as Nitzanim Youth Village  in 1949-1990.

Nitzan

In 1990, the modern community settlement of Nitzan was established on the site of the youth village. By 1995 it had a population of 105. It experienced rapid expansion in the mid-2000s after being selected to temporarily house a large group of families evacuated from Gush Katif as part of the disengagement plan. (Many of them were Bnei Menashe immigrants.) 500 temporary caravillas were constructed on the eastern end of Nitzan (an area that became Nitzan Bet), and 250 more were ordered by the Israeli Government.

Several environmental organisations objected to the new construction, which increased Nitzan's area by four-and-a-half times. They feared damage to the fragile sand dune ecosystem. The neighbourhood was also the target of criticism by settlers and Israeli human-rights groups, citing a lack of adequate housing and facilities. They argued that governmental negligence resulted in a housing shortage, forcing large families to separate into multiple caravillas, and that basic infrastructure like a youth area, nursery, and synagogue were absent.

On 12 July 2012, the organization United With Israel delivered bomb shelters to the residents of Nitzan. It was a major event for the residents of Nitzan, whose children needed kindergarten bomb shelters. The event included children painting the shelters with murals, supervised by a professional mural artist.

References

Community settlements
Religious Israeli communities
Populated places in Southern District (Israel)
Populated places established in 1949
1949 establishments in Israel